In statistics, latent variables (from Latin: present participle of lateo, “lie hidden”) are variables that can only be inferred indirectly through a mathematical model from other observable variables that can be directly observed or measured. Such latent variable models are used in many disciplines, including political science, demography, engineering, medicine, ecology, physics, machine learning/artificial intelligence, bioinformatics, chemometrics, natural language processing, management and the social sciences.

Latent variables may correspond to aspects of physical reality. These could in principle be measured, but may not be for practical reasons. In this situation, the term hidden variables is commonly used (reflecting the fact that the variables are meaningful, but not observable). Other latent variables correspond to abstract concepts, like categories, behavioral or mental states, or data structures. The terms hypothetical variables or hypothetical constructs may be used in these situations.

The use of latent variables can serve to reduce the dimensionality of data. Many observable variables can be aggregated in a model to represent an underlying concept, making it easier to understand the data. In this sense, they serve a function similar to that of scientific theories. At the same time, latent variables link observable "sub-symbolic" data in the real world to symbolic data in the modeled world.

Examples

Psychology 

Latent variables, as created by factor analytic methods, generally represent "shared" variance, or the degree to which variables "move" together. Variables that have no correlation cannot result in a latent construct based on the common factor model.

 The "Big Five personality traits" have been inferred using factor analysis.
 extraversion
 spatial ability
 wisdom “Two of the more predominant means of assessing wisdom include wisdom-related performance and latent variable measures.”
 Spearman's g, or the general intelligence factor in psychometrics

Economics

Examples of latent variables from the field of economics include quality of life, business confidence, morale, happiness and conservatism: these are all variables which cannot be measured directly. But linking these latent variables to other, observable variables, the values of the latent variables can be inferred from measurements of the observable variables. Quality of life is a latent variable which cannot be measured directly so observable variables are used to infer quality of life. Observable variables to measure quality of life include wealth, employment, environment, physical and mental health, education, recreation and leisure time, and social belonging.

Medicine

Latent-variable methodology is used in many branches of medicine. A class of problems that naturally lend themselves to latent variables approaches are longitudinal studies where the time scale (e.g. age of participant or time since study baseline) is not synchronized with the trait being studied. For such studies, an unobserved time scale that is synchronized with the trait being studied can be modeled as a transformation of the observed time scale using latent variables. Examples of this include disease progression modeling and modeling of growth (see box).

Inferring latent variables

There exists a range of different model classes and methodology that make use of latent variables and allow inference in the presence of latent variables.  Models include:

 linear mixed-effects models and nonlinear mixed-effects models
 Hidden Markov models
 Factor analysis
 Item response theory

Analysis and inference methods include:
 Principal component analysis
 Instrumented principal component analysis
 Partial least squares regression
 Latent semantic analysis and probabilistic latent semantic analysis
 EM algorithms
 Metropolis–Hastings algorithm

Bayesian algorithms and methods

Bayesian statistics is often used for inferring latent variables.

 Latent Dirichlet allocation
 The Chinese restaurant process is often used to provide a prior distribution over assignments of objects to latent categories.
 The Indian buffet process is often used to provide  a prior distribution over assignments of latent binary features to objects.

See also

 Confounding
 Dependent and independent variables
 Errors-in-variables models
 Evidence lower bound
 Factor analysis
 Intervening variable
 Latent variable model
 Item response theory
 Partial least squares path modeling
 Partial least squares regression
 Proxy (statistics)
 Rasch model
 Structural equation modeling

References

Further reading
 

Social research
Bayesian networks
Econometric modeling
 Latent variable
Psychometrics

de:Latente Variable